Jerome Foster II (born May 9, 2002) is an American environmental activist. He is the youngest-ever White House Advisor in United States history, as a member of the White House Environmental Justice Advisory Council within the Biden administration. Foster is a leading voice for marginalized  and working class communities in spaces pushing for social, economic and environmental justice. Foster is one of the major organizers of Fridays for Future; holding weekly climate strikes at the front gates of the White House for over 57 weeks. He has previously served as a congressional intern for U.S. Representative John Lewis at the age of 16 years old and served on the Washington DC State Board of Education's Advisory Council at the age of 14 years old.

Foster has helped organize some of the largest climate marches in Washington, D.C. and has spoken at the United Nations High Commission on Human Rights in April 2019 and the United Nations Youth Climate Summit in September 2019. Foster gained international recognition after organizing climate strikes outside the White House and being interviewed by Former Vice President Al Gore at the Atlanta Climate Reality Leadership Training in March 2019.

Early life 
Jerome Foster II was born in Washington, D.C. on May 9, 2002 by his mother René Foster, and father, Jerome Foster Sr. Foster attended Washington Leadership Academy High School, graduating in June 2020. In 2019, he was selected by the D.C. Office of the State Superintendent of Education to attend Harvard University during his eleventh grade summer. Foster graduated from high school in June 2020 and studies computer science at Pace University.

Activism

TAU VR 
When Foster was 14 years old, he founded an immersive technology organisation, TAU VR, which built virtual reality environments regarding American History, Climate Change, and Latin American Immigration to the United States, and more. In September 2017, TAU VR was featured on XQ Super School Live, which was aired on ABC, CBS, NBC, and FOX which depicted his story of placing 3rd at the World Series of Entrepreneurship.

The Climate Reporter 
Foster, in November 2017, founded The Climate Reporter, an international youth-led climate-focused news outlet that reports.

White House climate strikes 
As a part of Greta Thunberg's School Strike for Climate protest, Foster held weekly climate strikes in front of the White House in Lafayette Square. On September 13, 2019, Thunberg as a part of her trans-American voyage to COP 25 in Santiago, Chile joined Foster's White House climate strikes which drew thousands to the site. Through organizing these climate strikes, Foster met Jane Fonda and has gone on to collaborate with Fonda on her Fire Drill Fridays.

OneMillionOfUs 
Foster founded OneMillionOfUs in early 2019. Which is an international non-profit youth voting and advocacy organization. It aims to "educate, empower and mobilise a movement of young people to be civically active and engage on the local and global stage through their intersectional youth-focused civic partnerships", OneMillionOfUs has built a large coalition that will provide young people with the tools they need to spur systemic change in their communities, school buildings and political offices. This organization also created a "Uniting Youth Coalition" representing 5 youth social movements: gun violence, climate change, immigration reform, gender equality, and racial equality to have a space on both the local and international level to coordinate events and campaigns between movements.

COP27 Scrutiny on LGBTQ+ Rights 
In July 2022, Foster and his partner, Elijah McKenzie-Jackson, co-authored a letter to the UNFCCC to call on the United Nations to move COP27 climate summit due to Egypt's "LGBTQ+ torture, woman slaughter, and civil rights suppression" he says after they started looking into logistics of traveling to Sharm El-Sheikh. As Foster is an openly-public bisexual figure, him and his parter "might be targeted" according to Guardian News.

The letter, which was directed towards UNFCCC Executive-Secretary, Patricia Espinosa, was sign by prominent activists such as Nadya Tolokonnikova, Ahmed Alaa, and Eric Njuguna. The couple are calling the UNFCCC non-action a betrayal of the community and “inherent discrimination.” Foster emphasized that, “there are better options of countries in Africa that will still include African voices. People shouldn’t be cannon fodder for the climate movement. Cop27 will fail if it’s in Egypt because critical voices will be left out.”

Politics

District of Columbia State Board of Education 
At 15 years old, Foster became the sole student representative serving on the District of Columbia State Board of Education High School Graduation Requirements Task Force, working to modernize high school graduation requirements starting with the class of 2030 across the District.

Congressional internship 
At 16 years old, Foster applied to be an intern for U.S. Representative John Lewis, as described in an interview in late 2020. On Fridays during his internship, he held weekly climate rallies at the front gates of the White House as a part of Greta Thunberg's Fridays For Future movement  to advocate for the passage of the Climate Change Education Act which would add environmental education as a core subject in all American schools and provide funding for colleges to further research into the climate crisis.

Biden administration
On March 29, 2021, the White House announced that Foster would serve as an advisor on the White House Environmental Justice Advisory Council, providing recommendations on environmental injustice.

Personal life 
Foster has been in a relationship with British climate activist Elijah McKenzie-Jackson since 2021.

Honors and awards 
 World Series of Entrepreneurship – 2017
 D.C. State Board of Education Leadership and Commitment Award – 2018
Union of Concerned Scientists' Defender of Science Award 2019
Audubon Naturalist Society 2020 Youth Environmental Champion Award
Grist 50! Environmental Fixer Achievement - 2020
The Root's Young Futurist Achievement - 2020
Captain Planet Foundation Young Superhero for Earth Award -2022
Business Insider Climate Action 30 Achievement - 2022

Filmography

Bibliography 

 "What Can I Do?: My Path from Climate Despair to Action" by Jane Fonda; Biography, 2020
 "Stone Soup for a Sustainable World: Life-Changing Stories of Young Heroes" by Marianne Larned; Biography, 2021
 "Amara and the Bats" by Emma Reynolds; Children's Picture Book, 2021

References

External links

 
 
 
 

2002 births
Living people
Climate activists
American child activists
American environmentalists
African-American people
Virtual reality pioneers
Activists from Washington, D.C.
Biden administration personnel
Pace University alumni
Harvard College alumni
Youth climate activists